This is a list of Italian football transfers for the 2006–07 season. Only moves from Serie A and Serie B are listed.

The summer transfer window would run from 1 July 2006, the end of the 2005–06 season, with a few transfers taking place prior to the season's complete end.

July deals

August deals

See also
List of Italian football transfers winter 2006–07

References
general

specific

Italy
Trans
2006